Annie, Leave the Room! is a 1935 British comedy film directed by Leslie S. Hiscott and starring Morton Selten, Eva Moore and Jane Carr. It was made at Twickenham Studios as a quota quickie for release by Universal Pictures.

Cast
 Morton Selten as Lord Spendlove  
 Eva Moore as Mrs. Morley 
 Jane Carr as Adrienne Ditmar  
 Davina Craig as Annie  
 Richard Cooper as The Honourable Algernon Lacey 
 Jane Welsh as Lady Mary  
 Ben Welden as Raisins  
 Arthur Finn as Al Gates  
 Edward Underdown as John Brandon  
 Alfred Wellesley

References

Bibliography
 Low, Rachael. Filmmaking in 1930s Britain. George Allen & Unwin, 1985.
 Wood, Linda. British Films, 1927-1939. British Film Institute, 1986.

External links

1935 films
British comedy films
1935 comedy films
1930s English-language films
Films shot at Twickenham Film Studios
Films directed by Leslie S. Hiscott
Quota quickies
Films set in England
British black-and-white films
1930s British films